Carl-Christian "Calle" Halfvarsson (born 17 March 1989) is a Swedish cross-country skier who has been competing in the FIS World Cup since 2009. He was part of Swedish relay team that finished second at the 2013 World Championships in  Val di Fiemme, Italy. His best overall Tour de Ski result was third in 2014/2015.

Cross-country skiing results
All results are sourced from the International Ski Federation (FIS).

Olympic Games

Distance reduced to 30 km due to weather conditions.

World Championships
 3 medals – (2 silver, 1 bronze)

World Cup

Season standings

Individual podiums
 3 victories – (3 ) 
 18 podiums – (8 , 10 )

Team podiums
 2 victories – (2 ) 
 8 podiums – (6 , 2 )

References

External links

 
 
 
  

1989 births
Living people
People from Falun Municipality
Cross-country skiers from Dalarna County
Swedish male cross-country skiers
FIS Nordic World Ski Championships medalists in cross-country skiing
Tour de Ski skiers
Cross-country skiers at the 2014 Winter Olympics
Cross-country skiers at the 2018 Winter Olympics
Cross-country skiers at the 2022 Winter Olympics
Olympic cross-country skiers of Sweden